Malherbe-sur-Ajon is a commune in the department of Calvados, northwestern France. The municipality was established on 1 January 2016 by merger of the former communes of Banneville-sur-Ajon and Saint-Agnan-le-Malherbe.

See also 
Communes of the Calvados department

References 

Communes of Calvados (department)
Populated places established in 2016
2016 establishments in France